Bebearia osyris, or Winifred's forester, is a butterfly in the family Nymphalidae. It is found in Guinea, Sierra Leone, Liberia, Ivory Coast and Ghana. The habitat consists of primary forests.

Adults are attracted to fruit.

References

Butterflies described in 1920
osyris